is a professional race car driver.

Complete Formula Nippon results 
(key) (Races in bold indicate pole position) (Races in italics indicate fastest lap)

References 

1962 births
Living people
Japanese racing drivers